Mississagi River Provincial Park is a protected area on the Mississagi River in Algoma and Sudbury Districts, Ontario, Canada. It has an Ontario Parks designation of Waterway Class. The park encompasses the river and lakes on the river from Mississagi Lake to Bark Lake, and further downstream to a point just above Ricky Island Lake, as well as portions of the upper Spanish River system.

References

External links

Parks in Algoma District
Parks in Sudbury District
Provincial parks of Ontario
Protected areas established in 1990
1990 establishments in Ontario